Aranos is a town in the Hardap Region of central South east Namibia.

Politics
Until 2010 Aranos was governed by a 5-seat village council. Since it was upgraded to "town" status in 2010 there is now a town council that has seven seats.

In the 2010 local authority election, SWAPO received the most votes with 546. The Democratic Turnhalle Alliance (DTA) finished in 2nd place with 205 votes, followed by the Rally for Democracy and Progress (RDP, 186), SWANU (17) and the Congress of Democrats (15). SWAPO also won the 2015 election, gaining four seats in the town council (598 votes). The RDP gained two seats (246 votes), and the DTA one (194).

The 2020 local authority election was won by the newly formed Landless People's Movement (LPM) which scored well all over Hardap. LPM gained 745 votes and three seats in the town council, followed by SWAPO with two seats (465 votes), the likewise new Independent Patriots for Change (IPC) with one seat (283 votes) and the Popular Democratic Movement (PDM, the successor of the DTA), also with one seat and 90 votes. The current mayor is Marline Claasen.

People
Aranos is the birthplace of former National Assembly member  Jurie Viljoen and human rights activist Pauline Dempers.

Gallery

References

Populated places in the Hardap Region
Towns in Namibia